The 1994 Challenge Bell was a tennis tournament played on indoor carpet courts at the Club Avantage Multi-Sports in Quebec City in Canada that was part of Tier III of the 1994 WTA Tour. It was the 2nd edition of the Challenge Bell, and was held from October 31 through November 6, 1994. Katerina Maleeva won the singles title.

Champions

Singles

 Katerina Maleeva def.  Brenda Schultz, 6–3, 6–3
It was Maleeva's only title of the year and the 20th of her career.

Doubles

 Elna Reinach /  Nathalie Tauziat def.  Linda Harvey-Wild /  Chanda Rubin, 6–4, 6–3
It was Reinach's only title of the year and the 18th of her career. It was Tauziat's 2nd title of the year and the 9th of her career.

External links
Official website

Challenge Bell
Tournoi de Québec
Challenge Bell
1990s in Quebec City